Lluís Marín Tarroch (born 12 October 1988) is an Andorran snowboarder. He competed for Andorra at the 2010 Winter Olympics in snowboard cross. Marin was Andorra's flag bearer during the 2010 Winter Olympics opening ceremony.  Tarroch failed to qualify for the head-to-head rounds of his event after falling in one of his runs and ended up in 34th place.

Notes

References

External links 
 
 
 

1988 births
Living people
Andorran male snowboarders
Olympic snowboarders of Andorra
Snowboarders at the 2010 Winter Olympics
Snowboarders at the 2014 Winter Olympics
Snowboarders at the 2018 Winter Olympics